A glycine reuptake inhibitor (GRI) is a type of drug which inhibits the reuptake of the neurotransmitter glycine by blocking one or more of the glycine transporters (GlyTs). Examples of GRIs include bitopertin (RG1678), Org 24598, Org 25935, ALX-5407, and sarcosine, which are selective GlyT1 blockers, and Org 25543 and N-arachidonylglycine, which are selective GlyT2 blockers. Some weak and/or non-selective GlyT blockers include amoxapine and ethanol (alcohol).

See also
 Reuptake inhibitor
 Glycinergic
 GABA reuptake inhibitor
 Excitatory amino acid reuptake inhibitor

References

Glycine reuptake inhibitors